The International School of Port of Spain is an international school in Westmoorings, Trinidad and Tobago. It is a private, co-educational day school offering pre-kindergarten through grade 12 classes. The school opened in September 1994.

Students 
The school has around 445 students. ISPS students have gone on to prestigious universities in England, Canada and the United States.

Organization 
The school is governed by a Board of Directors with seven primary members, each of whom has an alternate. Six of the directors are elected from the Parent-Teacher Organization and 8 are representatives of major corporate sponsors of the School, including the U.S. Embassy. The school is operated with the consent and support of the Government of Trinidad and Tobago.

Curriculum 
The curriculum is a U.S. academic college-preparatory school. Spanish is taught as a foreign language from grade 2. All students participate in art, music, physical education, drama, health, and computer studies as well as in core academic subjects. There are separate elementary, middle and high schools. Advanced Placement courses have been in place since August 1997. A program exists for students with mild learning difficulties. The school is accredited by the Southern Association of Colleges and Schools. Apart from a prestigious academic program, ISPS also offers many opportunities for students to explore and enhance their abilities in the arts and athletics.

Faculty 
In the 2022-23 school year, there were 62 total staff, comprising 45 teachers (7 of which are U.S. citizens), 32 host-country nationals and 6 third-country nationals. The director facilitates a number of educational initiatives within the school and local community.

Enrollment 
At the beginning of the 2022-23 school year, enrollment was 245. Of the total, 55 were U.S. citizens, 109 were host-country nationals and 81 were third-country nationals.

Facilities 
The school is located west of the capital city of Port of Spain in Westmoorings. The school is housed on a purpose-built campus that was opened in May 1999 on reclaimed land that used to be under the ocean nearby. Instructional spaces include a multi-purpose hall, a cafeteria, 3 computer labs, 4 science labs, 2 art rooms, a library/media center, 30 classrooms, fully air-conditioned gymnasium, athletic fields, asphalt play yards, a sandy playground, and enclosed activity areas.

Finances 
In the year 2016-2017, Domestic Tuitions (students who are either: citizens & residents of Trinidad & Tobago, or a residents in Trinidad and Tobago under CSME regulations) were as follows: PK: $8,000-$13,290; Kdg.-grade 5: $13,870; grades 6-8: $15,866, and grades 9-12: $17,589. International Tuitions (students who are internationally mobile, affiliated with multinational businesses, affiliated with multinational agencies, affiliated with diplomatic organizations or who are not permanent residents of Trinidad & Tobago) are: PK: $10,000-$13,290; Kdg.-grade 5: $19,166; grades 6-8: $19,510; and grade 9-12: $19,858. (All fees are quoted in US dollars.)

See also 
 List of schools in Trinidad and Tobago

External links 
 International School of Port of Spain

Sources
This article has been adapted from a US Department of State report released on October 6, 2022. The source is in the public domain.
 online report

References

Educational institutions established in 1994
Port of Spain
Schools in Trinidad and Tobago
International Baccalaureate schools
1994 establishments in Trinidad and Tobago